The Tenant of Wildfell Hall most commonly refers to:

The Tenant of Wildfell Hall, the novel by Anne Brontë

The Tenant of Wildfell Hall may also refer to:

Film and television
The Tenant of Wildfell Hall (1968 TV series), starring Janet Munro, Corin Redgrave and Bryan Marshall.
The Tenant of Wildfell Hall (1996 TV series), starring Tara Fitzgerald, Rupert Graves, James Purefoy and Toby Stephens.